Madlen Rasmiyevna Dzhabrailova is a Russian actress, Merited Artist of the Russian Federation. She appeared in over 40 films.

Biography 
Madeleine was born into the family of the Honored Artist of Russia Rasmi Djabrailov. She studied at the directing department of GITIS, after which she began to play in the Moscow theater Workshop of Pyotr Fomenko. Since 1986 she has been acting in films.

Selected filmography

References

External links 
 Madlen Dzhabrailova on kino-teatr.ru

1970 births
Living people
Russian film actresses
Russian stage actresses
Russian Academy of Theatre Arts alumni
Actresses from Moscow
Honored Artists of the Russian Federation
Russian people of Lezgian descent